Sonex Aircraft, LLC is an American kit aircraft manufacturer located in Oshkosh, Wisconsin, producing kits for four all-metal homebuilt monoplanes. The company was founded in 1998 by John Monnett, who has designed the Monnett Sonerai sport aircraft series, Monnett Monerai sailplane, Monnett Moni motorglider, and Monnett Monex racer.  Monnett designs are displayed in the Steven F. Udvar-Hazy Center of the National Air and Space Museum  near Washington D.C.

In June 2018, John Monnett announced his plan to retire and sell the company. In January 2022, Sonex employee and general manager, Mark Schaible, purchased the assets of Sonex Aircraft LLC and Sonex Aerospace LLC, forming them into a new company, Sonex LLC. Schaible will be owner and president of the new company.

Aircraft
In 2013, the  FAA National Kit Evaluation Team (NKET) approved fast-build "51% rule" versions of the Sonex, Waiex, and Onex.

In December 2019 the John Monnett-designed Sonerai was acquired by Sonex Aircraft.

Engines
Company subsidiary AeroConversions manufactures the AeroConversions AeroVee Engine, a custom aircraft implementation of the Volkswagen air-cooled engine.

Hornet's Nest
The Hornet's Nest is the research and development arm of Sonex LLC.

E-flight
At AirVenture 2007, Sonex Aircraft announced a project to work on innovative technologies in aviation. The E-flight projects includes using an electric motor, ethanol-based fuels, and other power plant alternatives. In December 2010, an all-electric Waiex was test flown from Wittman field in Oshkosh, Wisconsin. The aircraft was flown with a  brushless DC electric motor, managed by a newly designed controller. Power is from a collection of 14.5 kW-hour lithium polymer batteries, giving the aircraft an endurance of one hour at low-speed cruise or 15 minutes of aerobatics.  This was the beginning of the development of the Sonex Electric Sport Aircraft.

References

External links

Aircraft manufacturers of the United States
Monnett aircraft
Aviation in Wisconsin
1998 establishments in Wisconsin
American companies established in 1998
Manufacturing companies established in 1998
Oshkosh, Wisconsin